Edson Gomes Cardoso Santos, born on , in Salvador, Bahia, nicknamed Jacaré, is a Brazilian dancer and Actor.

Cardoso, a performer to musical genres of pagode and samba reggae, is foremost known for his membership in the popular É o Tchan!. In later years, he assorted his artistic life by acting in comedies shows A Turma do Didi and Aventuras do Didi of Rede Globo that star Renato Aragão. Currently Santos lives in Canada

References

http://kogut.oglobo.globo.com/noticias-da-tv/noticia/2013/11/ex-dancarino-jacare-fara-serie-de-aguinaldo-silva-na-globo.html

External links

Living people
1972 births
Brazilian male dancers
Brazilian male television actors
People from Salvador, Bahia
20th-century Brazilian dancers
21st-century Brazilian dancers
20th-century Brazilian male actors
21st-century Brazilian male actors